The 2016–17 New Hampshire Wildcats women's basketball team represented the University of New Hampshire during the 2016–17 NCAA Division I women's basketball season. The Wildcats, led by seventh-year head coach Maureen Magarity, played their home games in Lundholm Gym and are members of the America East Conference. They finished the season 26–6, 15–1 in America East play win the America East regular season title. They advanced to the semifinals of the America East women's tournament where they lost to Maine. As champs of the America East Conference who failed to win their conference tournament, they received an automatic bid to the Women's National Invitation Tournament where they lost to Harvard in the first round.

Media
All non-televised home games and conference road games streamed on either ESPN3 or AmericaEast.tv. Select home games aired on Fox College Sports, Live Well Network, or WBIN. Most road games streamed on the opponent's website. All conference home games and select non-conference home games were broadcast on the radio on WPKX, WGIR and online on the New Hampshire Portal.

Roster

Schedule

|-
!colspan=12 style="background:#191970; color:#FFFFFF;"| Non-conference regular season

|-
!colspan=12 style="background:#191970; color:#FFFFFF;"| America East regular season

|-
!colspan=12 style="background:#191970; color:#FFFFFF;"| America East Women's Tournament

|-
!colspan=9 style="background:#191970;"| Women's National Invitation Tournament

Rankings

See also
 2016–17 New Hampshire Wildcats men's basketball team

References

New Hampshire
New Hampshire Wildcats women's basketball seasons
2017 Women's National Invitation Tournament participants
New Hamp
New Hamp